Ländle (diminutive of land in some dialects of the German language, notably Low Alemannic and Swabian) is sometimes used in German as a colloquial sobriquet for any of the following territories:

 the south-western German State of Baden-Württemberg
 the historical region of Swabia, encompassing the eastern two-thirds of Baden-Württemberg as well as the western portion of Bavaria, where the Swabian language is most primarily spoken
 the westernmost Austrian State of Vorarlberg
 the Grand Duchy of Luxembourg
 the Principality of Liechtenstein